Best of Blue is the first greatest hits compilation album released by English boy band Blue. The album was released in the United Kingdom on 15 November 2004, by Innocent Records. It was due to be supported by a European tour of the same name, but this was cancelled in February 2005.

Singles 
 "Curtain Falls" — The debut single, released in November 2004. The single peaked at No. 4 on the UK Singles Chart, No. 3 on the Australian Top 40, at No. 1 in New Zealand and No. 5 in Ireland. The song has received a Silver sales status certification for sales of over 200,000 copies in the UK.
 "Get Down on It" — The second single, released in January 2005. The song is a cover version of Kool & the Gang's number one hit. The single features instruments by Kool & The Gang, as well as vocals from Lil' Kim. The single peaked at No. 5 on the Australian Top 40, No. 1 in New Zealand and No. 17 in Ireland.
 "Only Words I Know" — The third single, released in June 2005. The single was not released in the United Kingdom, but found fair success in France and Italy, peaking at No. 2 in both countries. The single was used to promote the release of the group's second greatest hits compilation, 4Ever Blue.

Track listing

Charts

Weekly charts

Year-end charts

Certifications and sales

References 

2004 greatest hits albums
Blue (English band) compilation albums
Innocent Records compilation albums